Håkan Adolfsson (born 10 September 1971) is a Swedish former bandy player who most recently Vetlanda BK as a forward.

Håkan has only played for Vetlanda BK where he began playing professionally in 1992. He has now made over 200 appearances for the club and is its longest serving player along with Rolf Hedberg who also began with the club in the 1992–93 season.

References

External links 
 Håkan Adolfsson at bandysidan

Swedish bandy players
Living people
1971 births
Vetlanda BK players